Buckau is a quarter of the city of Magdeburg, capital of the German state of Saxony-Anhalt. It covers an area of 2.1803 km² and has a population of 6,217 (as of 31 December 2020). Its name originates from the Slavic name "Bukow". "Buk" means "beech" in Polish.

Geography 
Buckau lies directly on the river Elbe opposite the southern part of the Rotehorn Landscape Park. To the north, on the roads of Erich-Weinert-Straße and Schönebecker Straße towards Harnackstraße and Steubenallee is Magdeburg’s old town, the Altstadt. To the south the boundary with Fermersleben is the ‘’Schanzenweg and its projection to the banks of the Elbe.
The building complex of Erich-Weinert-Straße 5 belongs to the quarter. This may be transferred to the quarter of Leipziger Straße as a result of protest action by a local woman.

West of Buckau, the railway line from Magdeburg to Leipzig Buckau with the S-Bahn stop of SKET-Industriepark and the roads of Schanzenweg and Schilfbreite form the boundary with the quarters of Leipziger Straße and Hopfengarten. Buckau ist also the start of the so-called chain of pearls of quarters which include Fermersleben, Salbke and Westerhüsen to the south. Apart from its northern and southern areas, the quarter is densely populated and still has several entire streets in the architectural Gründerzeit style. Buckau has its own station and is well served by local public transport services. There is a ferry over the Elbe from Buckau to the Rotehornpark.

References

External links 

Buckau in the Stadtwiki Magdeburg (MagdeWiki)
Short video with a circular view of the Elbe, the Stern Bridge and Speicher

Geography of Magdeburg
Elbe